Love and Glamour is a women's eau de toilette fragrance endorsed by American entertainer Jennifer Lopez.

Background and conception 
Lopez released her first signature perfume, Glow by JLo, in 2002; it went on to become the second-highest-selling fragrance in the United States. With this, she became a pioneer for the celebrity endorsement of perfume, and influenced various other celebrities to follow the trend. By the time of Love and Glamour's release in October 2010, Lopez's fragrances had taken in over $1 billion worldwide.

In an interview with Women's Wear Daily, Lopez explained the inspiration behind the perfume:

Development 
Lopez worked side by side with Coty, Inc. to create the signature fragrance blend of Love and Glamour, and was heavily involved in the creation process.

According to Lopez, creating the scent was the most difficult part of the process, as compared to putting together the packaging and the marketing campaign.

Scent and bottle 
Love and Glamour has top notes of Italian mandarin, guava and peach flesh; heart notes of coconut, orange blossom and jasmine petals; and base notes of sandalwood, musk and amber. Lopez hoped to create "a combination that people have never smelled before".

Love and Glamour's bottle was designed by Lopez with the aid of designer Jon DiNapoli. It is shaped to resemble "a woman wearing an elegant gown", and was described by Alessandra Greco of Vogue as curvy, sexy and seductive.

Marketing and reception 
Love and Glamour made its debut at a Macy's department store in New York City on September 11, 2010.  A promotional website was launched that allowed online viewers to unlock an exclusive behind-the-scenes film noir style video clip of Lopez. The campaign for the scent was shot by photographer Craig McDean on a movie set, with Lopez's hair and make up styled to match a classic film star.

Seventeen magazine was positive about Love and Glamour, writing: "it's definitely a scent that's going to have everyone asking what you're wearing".

Products 
List of Love and Glamour products:
50ml Eau de Parfum
75ml  Eau de Parfum
200ml body care lotion

Love and Glamour was also made available in a gift set that included a body lotion and shower gel.

See also 
 List of celebrity-branded fragrances

References 

Jennifer Lopez products
Products introduced in 2010
Jennifer Lopez perfumes
Perfumes released by Coty, Inc.